The 127th district of the Texas House of Representatives contains parts of Harris County. The current Representative is Dan Huberty, who was first elected in 2010.

References 

127